Johannesburg is a census-designated place (CDP) in Kern County, California, in a mining district of the Rand Mountains. The terminus of the Randsburg Railway was here from 1897 to 1933. The population was 172 at the 2010 census, down from 176 at the 2000 census. Johannesburg is divided from the neighboring community of Randsburg by a ridge. The town is frequently referred to as "Jo-burg" by locals and frequent visitors to the northwest Mojave.

History
Johannesburg was founded to support mining operations at Randsburg.  In addition to providing rail access, the region's first wells were operated by companies located in Johannesburg.  During the first half of the 20th century, the Rand Mining District was the principal gold producing region of California.  Activity centered on the Yellow Aster Mine, discovered in 1894.  In 1919, the Rand Silver Mine was discovered east of town on Red Mountain.  The Rand Mine produced more silver than any mine in California.

Johannesburg was named by miners who had previously worked in the gold-producing region of South Africa.  Containing the city of Johannesburg, South Africa, this region is in the Witwatersrand, and is frequently referred to as "the Rand."

The first post office at Johannesburg opened in 1897.

Geography

Demographics

2010
At the 2010 census Johannesburg had a population of 172. The racial makeup of Johannesburg was 152 (88.4%) White, 2 (1.2%) African American, 2 (1.2%) Native American, 8 (4.7%) Asian, 0 (0.0%) Pacific Islander, 0 (0.0%) from other races, and 8 (4.7%) from two or more races. Hispanic or Latino of any race were 8 people (4.7%).

The whole population lived in households, no one lived in non-institutionalized group quarters and no one was institutionalized.

There were 95 households, 10 (10.5%) had children under the age of 18 living in them, 32 (33.7%) were opposite-sex married couples living together, 2 (2.1%) had a female householder with no husband present, 3 (3.2%) had a male householder with no wife present.  There were 7 (7.4%) unmarried opposite-sex partnerships, and 1 (1.1%) same-sex married couples or partnerships. 47 households (49.5%) were one person and 21 (22.1%) had someone living alone who was 65 or older. The average household size was 1.81.  There were 37 families (38.9% of households); the average family size was 2.76.

The age distribution was 21 people (12.2%) under the age of 18, 4 people (2.3%) aged 18 to 24, 26 people (15.1%) aged 25 to 44, 75 people (43.6%) aged 45 to 64, and 46 people (26.7%) who were 65 or older.  The median age was 55.0 years. For every 100 females, there were 109.8 males.  For every 100 females age 18 and over, there were 109.7 males.

There were 139 housing units at an average density of 57.6 per square mile, of the occupied units 73 (76.8%) were owner-occupied and 22 (23.2%) were rented. The homeowner vacancy rate was 2.7%; the rental vacancy rate was 14.8%.  137 people (79.7% of the population) lived in owner-occupied housing units and 35 people (20.3%) lived in rental housing units.

2000
At the 2000 census there were 176 people, 85 households, and 45 families in the CDP. The racial makeup of the CDP was 91.48% White, 0.57% Black or African American, 1.14% Native American and 2.84% from other races, and 3.98% from two or more races. 5.68% of the population were Hispanic or Latino of any race.
Of the 85 households 21.2% had children under the age of 18 living with them, 36.5% were married couples living together, 11.8% had a female householder with no husband present, and 45.9% were non-families. 35.3% of households were one person and 21.2% were one person aged 65 or older. The average household size was 2.07 and the average family size was 2.70.

The age distribution was 20.5% under the age of 18, 4.0% from 18 to 24, 22.2% from 25 to 44, 31.8% from 45 to 64, and 21.6% 65 or older. The median age was 48 years. For every 100 females, there were 95.6 males. For every 100 females age 18 and over, there were 97.2 males.

The median household income was $63,611 and the median family income  was $72,222. Males had a median income of $51,250 versus $31,250 for females. The per capita income for the CDP was $21,478. None of the families and 7.6% of the population were below the poverty line.  None are under the age of 18 or over 65.

References

Nunn, Cynthia Ackley (2019).  Abandoned California: King Solomon Mine.  Arcadia Publishing.
Wynn, Marcia Rittenhouse (1963).  Desert Bonanza.  Glendale, CA., A. H. Clark Co.

History of Kern County, California
Census-designated places in Kern County, California
Populated places in the Mojave Desert
Mining communities in California
Census-designated places in California